Haefeli Glacier is a glacier,  wide and  long, situated on Pernik Peninsula, Loubet Coast in Graham Land, Antarctica, at the northwest side of Finsterwalder Glacier and flowing south-southwest toward the head of Lallemand Fjord. With Finsterwalder and Klebelsberg Glaciers, its mouth merges with Sharp Glacier where the latter enters the fjord. It was first surveyed in 1946–47 by the Falkland Islands Dependencies Survey and named by them for Robert Haefeli, a Swiss glaciologist.

See also
 List of glaciers in the Antarctic
 Glaciology

References

 SCAR Composite Gazetteer of Antarctica.

Glaciers of Loubet Coast